Penn Station is a chain of restaurants specializing in what it calls "East Coast subs." The first restaurant was opened in 1985 by Jeff Osterfeld in Cincinnati, Ohio. Currently, Penn Station has over 300 locations in 15 states.

History

The concept for an East Coast sub restaurant came to Jeff Osterfeld soon after he graduated from Miami University in Oxford, Ohio.  In 1983, he opened "Jeffrey's Delicatessen" at the Dayton Mall in Dayton, Ohio. It was during a trip to Philadelphia that he first realized the popularity of the cheesesteak sandwich. He began selling  a version of the cheesesteak sandwich at his own restaurant, and it instantly became a huge hit.

He eventually expanded to Cincinnati, where he opened his first Penn Station restaurant in 1985. Originally, only four sandwiches were available, including the cheese steak. However, this first restaurant also offered fresh-cut french fries and freshly squeezed lemonade, two items that would become trademarks for Penn Station in the future.

By 1987, Osterfeld had opened several Penn Station restaurants in and around Cincinnati. He began selling franchises that year and restaurants soon opened in St. Louis, Louisville, and Nashville. Today, Penn Station has become a large chain across the 
East coast with 306 restaurants currently open in 15 states across the United States.

See also
 List of submarine sandwich restaurants

References

External links

 

Companies based in Cincinnati
Restaurants in Cincinnati
Economy of the Midwestern United States
Economy of the Southeastern United States
Regional restaurant chains in the United States
Fast-food chains of the United States
Restaurants established in 1985
Submarine sandwich restaurants
Cuisine of Cincinnati
1985 establishments in Ohio